Alexandrine von Schönerer (15 June 1850 – 28 November 1919) née Lucia was an Austrian theater owner, managing director and actress.

Life and career 
Schönerer was born in Vienna. Her father, Matthias von Schönerer (1807–1881), was the wealthy railroad pioneer in the employ of the Rothschilds. He was knighted by Emperor Franz Joseph in 1860. She had an older brother, Georg Ritter von Schönerer, who she repudiated his attitudes.

Schönerer became managing director of the Theater an der Wien from 1889 to 1905 after the lease ended in 1884 between her and the librettist Camillo Walzel. Under her direction, several operas were premiered including The Bartered Bride (1893), Königskinder (1897) and La Bohème.

According to an old agreement between Schönerer, the publisher Emil Berté and the librettists Bernhard Buchbinder and Alfred Maria Willner, Johann Strauss II composed his operetta Die Göttin der Vernunft, a French revolutionary comedy.  The operetta  premiered on March 13, 1897 and was presented 36 times.

On 17 March 1900, Schönerer sold the theater to Leon Dorer, Baron Emil Kubinsky and Josef Edler von Simon.

Schönerer always distanced herself from the antisemitism of her brother Georg von Schonerer.

Notes

References 

1919 deaths
1850 births
Artists from Vienna
Austrian theatre directors